Holcocera lignyodes is a moth in the  family Blastobasidae. It is found in Malawi.

References

Endemic fauna of Malawi
lignyodes
Lepidoptera of Malawi
Moths of Sub-Saharan Africa
Moths described in 1914